Richard William Stephen Shaw (December 8, 1966 – June 9, 2019), better known by his stage name Bushwick Bill, was a Jamaican-American rapper. He was a member of the Texas hip hop group Geto Boys, a group he originally joined as a breakdancer in 1986 as Little Billy. He went on to become one third of one incarnation of the group, alongside Willie D and Scarface.

Early life 
Bushwick Bill was born Richard William Stephen Shaw on December 8, 1966, in Kingston, Jamaica. His father was a merchant mariner, and his mother was a maid.

Career 
Shaw got his start in the music industry in 1986 as a member of the Geto Boys, where he performed as a dancer known as Little Billy. He later transitioned to rapping, and was featured on the Geto Boys' debut album, Making Trouble in 1988. The album received little attention and negative reviews, which led to Rap-A-Lot dropping all members from the group except for Bill and DJ Ready Red. Soon after, Rap-A-Lot CEO J. Prince recruited Scarface and Willie Dee, two local aspiring artists out of Texas as the second incarnation of the group. The new lineup began recording together in 1988 and their debut project as a group and second overall for the Geto Boys, Grip It! On That Other Level was released in 1989 to much better reception, being considered a classic album and one of the earliest entries into the Horrorcore genre. It was around this time the group's lyrical content began to generate controversy, which was multiplied in 1991 when the cover of the group's third album We Can't Be Stopped depicted a graphic image of Bill moments after he shot himself during an argument with his girlfriend. Nevertheless, the album went on to be their most successful to that point, being certified platinum in 1992.

Bushwick Bill can be heard on the album The Chronic by Dr. Dre; he appears in the video of "Dre Day" as one of Eazy-E's fellow rappers. His 1998 album No Surrender…No Retreat was dedicated to his friend Gil Epstein, a Fort Bend County prosecutor who was shot dead in Houston, Texas, in 1996.

Personal life 
On June 19, 1991, Shaw shot himself in the face following an argument with his former girlfriend, losing his right eye in the process; he had been under the influence of Everclear grain alcohol and PCP. The aftermath of the incident was documented on the album cover for Geto Boys' 1991 album We Can't Be Stopped, which shows Shaw being pushed through the hospital on a gurney by bandmates Willie D and Scarface. Shaw claimed he "died and came back to life" during the incident, and he made reference to it in his music.
In 2006, he became a born-again Christian.
In May 2010, Shaw was arrested in Georgia for possession of marijuana and cocaine. Based on his prior arrest record, he was facing deportation.

Illness and death 
On May 1, 2019, Shaw revealed that he had been diagnosed with stage 4 pancreatic cancer. Over a month later, on June 9, reports emerged that Shaw had died, but news of his death was later refuted by his son. However, it was subsequently reported and confirmed that Shaw died later that day at a hospital in Denver, Colorado.

Discography

References

External links 

Bushwick Bill on Myspace

1966 births
2019 deaths
American people with disabilities
Jamaican emigrants to the United States
American rappers of Jamaican descent
American shooting survivors
Converts to Christianity
Horrorcore artists
Entertainers with dwarfism
American performers of Christian hip hop music
Rappers from Houston
People from Bushwick, Brooklyn
Musicians from Brooklyn
Rappers from Brooklyn
People from Nassau County, New York
African-American male rappers
21st-century American rappers
Deaths from pancreatic cancer
Deaths from cancer in Colorado
People from Kingston, Jamaica
21st-century American male musicians
21st-century African-American musicians
20th-century African-American people